The 2013 Western Illinois Leathernecks football team represented Western Illinois University as the Missouri Valley Football Conference (MVFC) in the 2013 NCAA Division I FCS football season. They were led by first year head coach Bob Nielson and played their home games at Hanson Field. Western Illinois finished the season 4–8 overall and 2–6 in MVFC play to place ninth.

Schedule

Source: Schedule
^Game aired on a tape delayed basis

References

Western Illinois
Western Illinois Leathernecks football seasons
Western Illinois Leathernecks football